The 2023 Tour of Slovenia will be 29th edition of the Tour of Slovenia stage race scheduled between 14 and 18 June 2023. The 2.Pro-category race is a part of the UCI ProSeries.  Start of the race will be in Celje.

References

External links 
 

2023
Tour of Slovenia
Tour of Slovenia
Tour of Slovenia
Tour of Slovenia